Eilert is a male given name and may refer to:

Edvard Eilert Christie (1773–1831), Norwegian businessperson and politician
Eilert Bøhm (1900–1982), Norwegian gymnast who competed in the 1920 Summer Olympics
Eilert Dahl (1919–2004), Norwegian Nordic skier who competed in the late 1940s and early 1950s
Eilert Ekwall (born 1877), Professor of English at Lund University, Sweden, from 1909 to 1942
Eilert Falch-Lund (1875–1960), Norwegian sailor who competed in the 1908 and 1912 Summer Olympics
Eilert Määttä (born 1935), retired Swedish professional ice hockey player and coach
Eilert Pilarm (born 1953), Swedish Elvis impersonator
Eilert Stang Lund (born 1939), Norwegian judge
Eilert Sundt (1817–1875), Norwegian sociologist, known for his work on mortality, marriage and working class subjects

Surnames from given names
Masculine given names